Edward Lee House II (born May 14, 1978) is an American former professional basketball player. A guard known for his three-point shooting, House played for nine NBA teams in 11 seasons in the league. He was a member of the Boston Celtics team that won the NBA championship in 2008.

Early life
Eddie was born in the city of Berkeley, California, and was raised primarily in Union City, California, where he attended James Logan High School. House transferred to Hayward High School because he was forbidden from playing on the Logan varsity team in his freshman year. At Hayward, House was named All-Hayward Area Athletic League and All-Eastbay in both his junior and senior years, and graduated in 1996. He wanted to play for University of California, Berkeley, but coaches of that school felt that House wasn't ready for a major college basketball program, and recommended that House begin at a junior college.

College career 
House attended Arizona State University in Tempe, Arizona, on a full-ride scholarship. He is the all-time scoring leader at ASU with 2,044 points in his career, and is the only player to score more than 2,000 points. He, Ike Diogu, and James Harden are the only three Sun Devils to be named Pac-10 Player of the Year, and he was the fifth Sun Devil to be voted onto the All-Conference team twice.

He also is the career record-holder at Arizona State for field goals and steals, and set the single-season scoring average record for the school with 23.0 points per game in 1999–2000. During that season he was named Pac-10 Player of the Week a record-tying four times (matched only by Ed O'Bannon, Chris Mills, Gary Payton, and Quincy Pondexter).

House set a single-game Arizona State record with a 61-point effort in a 111–108 double-overtime victory against the California Golden Bears on the road in his senior season. It also was a memorable homecoming of sorts for him, as he had starred in high school for nearby Hayward High School. House also set a record in the game with 18 made free throws in 19 attempts. House is the first Pac-10 player to notch four 40-point games in one season as he had 61 vs. Cal, 46 vs. San Diego State, 42 vs. Penn State and 40 vs. UCLA. He also posted eight 30-point games that same season and set ASU records in points (736) and points per game (23.0). Also led the team in assists (111) and steals (74), as the 74 steals is tied for second on ASU single-season list. He is one of only three players to average in double figures in four consecutive seasons at Arizona State since it joined the Pac-10.

During his career at Arizona State, House went 0–8 against the Arizona Wildcats. During the 2014 Fiesta Bowl, House gave a motivational speech to the Boise State Football team on the importance of beating the Arizona Wildcats, Boise State's opponent. Incidentally, the Broncos won 38–30.

NBA career 
In the NBA, House was known for his three-point shooting.

He was selected by the Miami Heat in the second round (47th overall) of the 2000 NBA draft. He played in Miami for three seasons before leaving for the Los Angeles Clippers in free agency. After just one year in Los Angeles, House was traded to the Charlotte Bobcats. He then spent the 2004–05 NBA season playing for Charlotte, Milwaukee Bucks and Sacramento Kings. The following season House was signed by the Phoenix Suns; they reached the Western Conference Finals before losing to the Dallas Mavericks.

On August 17, 2006, he signed a one-year, $1.5 million deal with the New Jersey Nets.

On August 9, 2007, he signed a one-year, $1.5 million deal with the Boston Celtics. He joined a cast of all-stars dubbed as the Big Three – Paul Pierce, Kevin Garnett and Ray Allen. The team won the 2008 NBA Finals with House playing as a backup guard for either Ray Allen or Rajon Rondo. He played a pivotal role in the team's comeback victory in Game 4, knocking down two clutch three-pointers down the stretch. On July 23, 2008, he re-signed with the Celtics on a 2-year, $5.6 million deal, with the second year as player's option. During the 2008–09 regular season, he broke Danny Ainge's Celtics team record for best 3-point percentage in a season by shooting 44.4%.

On February 18, 2010, House, Bill Walker and J.R. Giddens were traded to the New York Knicks for Nate Robinson and Marcus Landry.

In July 2010 House's agent said that the guard agreed to terms on a $2.8 million, two-year contract with the Miami Heat.

On April 13, 2011, vs the Toronto Raptors, House scored a career high 35 points, beating his career NBA record by four points. The Heat made the 2011 NBA Finals and were defeated by the Dallas Mavericks in six games. Game 6 of that Finals series ended up being House's final NBA game ever. The Heat lost Game 6 95 – 105 and House recorded 9 points, 3 rebounds, 1 assist and 1 steal.

On June 30, 2011, House exercised an option clause in his contract, agreeing to a one-year, $1.4 million extension with the Heat. On Christmas Eve, he was waived by the Heat without playing a game for them during the 2011–2012 season.

Personal life 
He is the son of Edward House and Deborah Buck, and has two brothers, Diallo Buck and Mychal House. During his rookie season with Miami in 2000–01, he married the sister of professional basketball player Mike Bibby. The couple has three sons, Jaelen, who is currently playing basketball for University of New Mexico, and twins Kaden and Kalek. The two are now divorced. Both Eddie House and Mike Bibby played for the Sacramento Kings in 2004–05 and the Miami Heat in 2010–11. House is also cousins with current Philadelphia 76ers forward Danuel House. His son Jaelen played College Basketball at his alma mater for one year before transferring to The University of New Mexico.

House is currently an analyst on NBC Sports Boston.

NBA career statistics

Regular season 

|-
| align="left" | 
| align="left" | Miami
| 50 || 0 || 11.0 || .421 || .345 || .686 || .8 || 1.0 || .3 || .0 || 5.0 
|-
| align="left" | 
| align="left" | Miami
| 64 || 3 || 19.2 || .399 || .344 || .857 || 1.7 || 1.9 || .7 || .1 || 8.0
|-
| align="left" | 
| align="left" | Miami
| 55 || 7 || 18.6 || .387 || .300 || .861 || 1.8 || 1.6 || .8 || .0 || 7.5
|-
| align="left" | 
| align="left" | L.A. Clippers
| 60 || 10 || 19.8 || .359 || .375 || .800 || 2.3 || 2.5 || 1.1 || .1 || 6.8
|-
| align="left" | 
| align="left" | Charlotte
| 13 || 5 || 23.1 || .452 || .414 || .769 || 1.5 || 1.8 || 1.8 || .2 || 11.1
|-
| align="left" | 
| align="left" | Milwaukee
| 5 || 0 || 8.2 || .353 || .667 || .000 || .6 || 1.0 || .4 || .0 || 3.2
|-
| align="left" | 
| align="left" | Sacramento
| 50 || 2 || 11.0 || .458 || .452 || .929 || 1.2 || 1.3 || .4 || .1 || 4.7
|-
| align="left" | 
| align="left" | Phoenix
| 81 || 0 || 17.5 || .422 || .389 || .805 || 1.6 || 1.8 || .5 || .1 || 9.8
|-
| align="left" | 
| align="left" | New Jersey
| 56 || 1 || 16.9 || .428 || .429 || .917 || 1.6 || 1.2 || .5 || .1 || 8.4
|-
|style="text-align:left;background:#afe6ba;"|†
| align="left" | Boston
| 78 || 2 || 19.0 || .409 || .393 || .917 || 2.1 || 1.9 || .8 || .1 || 7.5
|-
| align="left" | 
| align="left" | Boston
| 81 || 0 || 18.3 || .445 || .444 || .792 || 1.9 || 1.1 || .8 || .1 || 8.5
|-
| align="left" | 
| align="left" | Boston
| 50 || 0 || 16.9 || .401 || .383 || .900 || 1.4 || 1.0 || .6 || .1 || 7.2
|-
| align="left" | 
| align="left" | New York
| 18 || 0 || 20.6 || .331 || .250 || 1.000 || 2.2 || 2.1 || .7 || .0 || 6.4
|-
| align="left" | 
| align="left" | Miami
| 56 || 1 || 17.5 || .399 || .389 || .950 || 1.6 || 1.1 || .6 || .1 || 6.5
|-
| align="left" | Career
| align="left" |
| 717 || 31 || 17.3 || .409 || .390 || .851 || 1.7 || 1.6 || .7 || .1 || 7.5

Playoffs 

|-
| align="left" | 2001
| align="left" | Miami
| 3 || 0 || 21.3 || .400 || .286 || .800 || 1.7 || 1.7 || 1.0 || .3 || 12.7
|-
| align="left" | 2005
| align="left" | Sacramento
| 3 || 0 || 7.7 || .375 || 1.000 || 1.000 || .7 || 1.3 || .0 || .0 || 3.0
|-
| align="left" | 2006
| align="left" | Phoenix
| 14 || 0 || 9.3 || .365 || .214 || .750 || .6 || .4 || .1 || .1 || 3.1
|-
| align="left" | 2007
| align="left" | New Jersey
| 4 || 0 || 4.5 || .250 || .167 || .000 || .5 || .3 || .3 || .0 || 1.3
|-
|style="text-align:left;background:#afe6ba;"|2008†
| align="left" | Boston
| 21 || 0 || 7.9 || .304 || .355 || .875 || 1.0 || .9 || .2 || .0 || 2.5
|-
| align="left" | 2009
| align="left" | Boston
| 14 || 0 || 16.6 || .519 || .486 || .909 || 1.4 || .9 || .8 || .0 || 7.7
|-
| align="left" | 2011
| align="left" | Miami
| 7 || 0 || 6.9 || .235 || .300 || .000 || .7 || .1 || .6 || .0 || 1.6
|-
| align="left" | Career
| align="left" |
| 66 || 0 || 10.3 || .391 || .368 || .867 || 1.0 || .7 || .4 || .1 || 4.0

See also
 List of NCAA Division I men's basketball players with 60 or more points in a game

References

External links 

Eddie House at nba.com

1978 births
Living people
20th-century African-American sportspeople
21st-century African-American sportspeople
African-American basketball players
American men's basketball players
Arizona State Sun Devils men's basketball players
Basketball players from Berkeley, California
Boston Celtics players
Charlotte Bobcats players
Los Angeles Clippers players
New York Knicks players
Miami Heat draft picks
Miami Heat players
Milwaukee Bucks players
New Jersey Nets players
People from Union City, California
Phoenix Suns players
Point guards
Sacramento Kings players
Shooting guards
Sportspeople from Hayward, California